Allsvenskan 2006, part of the 2006 Swedish football season, was the 82nd Allsvenskan season played. The first match was played 1 April 2006 and the last match was played 5 November 2006. IF Elfsborg won the league ahead of runners-up AIK, while BK Häcken, Östers IF and Örgryte IS were relegated.

Participating clubs

League table

Results

Relegation play-offs

Brommapojkarna won 4–1 on aggregate.

Season statistics

Top scorers

Scoring 
 Highest Scoring Match (7 goals) - Östers IF 3-4 IF Elfsborg, Hammarby IF 5-2 GAIS and Gefle IF 4-3 Malmö FF

Overall 
 Most Wins - IF Elfsborg, AIK and Hammarby IF (13)
 Fewest Wins - Örgryte IS (3)
 Most Losses - Östers IF and Örgryte IS (15)
 Fewest Losses - IF Elfsborg (2)
 Most Goals Scored - AIK (46)
 Fewest Goals Scored - Östers IF (19)
 Most Goals Conceded - Örgryte IS (46)
 Fewest Goals Conceded - IF Elfsborg (19)

Home 
 Most Wins - AIK (9)
 Fewest Wins - GAIS, BK Häcken, Östers IF and Örgryte IS (2)
 Most Losses - BK Häcken (8)
 Fewest Losses - IF Elfsborg, AIK and Helsingborgs IF (1)
 Most Goals Scored - AIK (30)
 Fewest Goals Scored - BK Häcken and Örgryte IS (12)
 Most Goals Conceded - Östers IF (25)
 Fewest Goals Conceded - IF Elfsborg (7)

Away 
 Most Wins - Kalmar FF (7)
 Fewest Wins - Örgryte IS (1)
 Most Losses - Örgryte IS (9)
 Fewest Losses - IF Elfsborg (1)
 Most Goals Scored - IF Elfsborg and IFK Göteborg (22)
 Fewest Goals Scored - Östers IF (5)
 Most Goals Conceded - Malmö FF (25)
 Fewest Goals Conceded - IF Elfsborg, AIK, Kalmar FF and Djurgårdens IF (12)

Attendances

References 

Online

Notes

External links

Allsvenskan seasons
Swed
Swed
1

pt:Allsvenskan 2007